Arctosa stigmosa is a wolf spider species found in Europe (France, Norway to Ukraine) and Iran.

See also 
 List of Lycosidae species

References

External links 

stigmosa
Spiders of Europe
Spiders of Asia
Spiders described in 1875